Murrisk is one of the baronies of County Mayo, in the southwest of the county. It lies between Clew Bay to the north and Killary Harbour to the south. Murrisk has an area of 544 km², and includes Clare Island and Inishturk. It's bordered by the baronies of Burrishoole to the north and east, Carra to the southeast, and the County Galway baronies of Ballynahinch and Ross to the south.

Towns and villages in Murrisk
Murrisk
Louisburgh
Westport
Carrownisky

References

Baronies of County Mayo